Year 1260 (MCCLX) was a leap year starting on Thursday (link will display the full calendar) of the Julian calendar.

Events 
 By place 
 Africa 
 October 24 – Saif ad-Din Qutuz, Mamluk sultan of Egypt, is assassinated by Baibars, who seizes power for himself.
 The civil servant and bard longing for lost al-Andalus, Ibn al-Abbar, is burnt at the stake by the Marinid ruler.
 The Arba'a Rukun Mosque is completed in Mogadishu. The Arba'a Rukun Mosque (Arabic: أربع روكون), also known as Arba Rucun, is a mosque in the medieval district Shangani, Mogadishu, Somalia.

 Asia 
 The Toluid Civil War begins between Kublai Khan and Ariq Böke, for the title of Great Khan.
 May 5 – Kublai Khan becomes a claimant to the Mongol Empire, after the death of Möngke Khan.
 May 21 –  Kublai sends his envoy Hao Jing to negotiate with Song Dynasty Chancellor Jia Sidao, after the small force left by Kublai south of the Yangtze River is destroyed, by a Chinese army of the Southern Song Dynasty. Chancellor Jia Sidao imprisons the entire embassy of Kublai. This slight will not be forgotten by Kublai, but he is unable to assault the Song, due to the civil war with his rival brother Ariq Böke.
 September 3 – Battle of Ain Jalut in Galilee: The Mamluks defeat the Mongols, marking their first decisive defeat, and the point of maximum expansion of the Mongol Empire. Isa ibn Muhanna is appointed amir al-ʿarab under the Mamluks.
 The Chinese era Jingding begins and ends in the Southern Song Dynasty of China.
 The Japanese Shōgen era ends, and the Bun'ō era begins.

 Europe 
 July 12 – Battle of Kressenbrunn: King Ottokar II of Bohemia captures Styria from King Béla IV of Hungary.
 July 13 – Livonian Crusade: The Baltic Samogitians and Curonians of the Grand Duchy of Lithuania decisively defeat the Livonian Order in the Battle of Durbe. This leads the Estonians of Saaremaa Island to once again rebel against the Livonian Order.
 September 4 – Battle of Montaperti: The Sienese Ghibellines, supported by the forces of King Manfred of Sicily, defeat the Florentine Guelphs.
 September 20 – Second of the two major Prussian uprisings by the Old Prussian tribe of Balts against the Teutonic Order begins.
 The Duchy of Saxony is divided into Saxony-Lauenberg and Saxony-Wittenberg, marking the end of the first Saxon state.
 War breaks out in the Valais (in modern-day Switzerland), as the Bishopry of Sion defends against an invasion by the County of Savoy.
 Croatia is divided into two sub-regions ruled by ban: the Croatian region on the south and Slavonian region on the north, by King Béla IV of Hungary.

 By topic 
 Arts and culture 
 October 24 – The Cathedral of Chartres is dedicated in the presence of King Louis IX of France (the cathedral is now a UNESCO World Heritage Site).
 Jacobus de Voragine compiles his work, the Golden Legend, a late medieval best-seller.
 The mosaic Christ between the Virgin and St Minias is made on the facade of Florence's Basilica di San Miniato al Monte.
 German musical theorist Franco of Cologne publishes Ars Cantus Mensurabilis, in which he advances a new theory of musical notation, in which the length of a musical note is denoted by the shape of that note, a system still used today.
 Construction begins on the Dunkeld Cathedral  in Perthshire, Scotland.
 Construction begins on the cathedrals at Meißen and Schwerin.
 Nicola Pisano sculpts the pulpit of the Pisa Baptistery.

 Religion 
 The newly formed Sukhothai Kingdom of Thailand adopts Theravada Buddhism.
 The advent of the Age of the Holy Spirit predicted by Joachim of Fiore, according to his interpretation of the Book of Revelation, chapter 6.

Births 
 May 15 or July 25 – John of Castile, Lord of Valencia de Campos (d. 1319)
 August 2 – Kyawswa of Pagan, last ruler of the Pagan Kingdom (d. 1299)
 approximate date
Enguerrand de Marigny, minister to King Philip IV of France
Fatima bint al-Ahmar, Nasrid princess in the Emirate of Granada (d. 1349)
Henry de Cobham, 1st Baron Cobham (d. 1339)
Matthew III Csák, Hungarian oligarch
Meister Eckhart, German theologian, philosopher and mystic (d. 1328)
Guillaume de Nogaret, keeper of the seal to King Philip IV of France (d. 1313)
Maximus Planudes, Byzantine grammarian and theologian (approximate date; d. 1330)
Khutulun, Mongol princess and warrior (d. 1306)

Deaths 
 April 28 – Luchesius Modestini, founding member of the Third Order of St. Francis
 May – Marie of Brabant, Holy Roman Empress, wife of Otto IV, Holy Roman Emperor (alternative date is June)
 August 9 – Walter of Kirkham, Bishop of Durham
 October 24 – Saif ad-Din Qutuz, Mamluk sultan of Egypt
 December 4 – Aymer de Valence, Bishop of Winchester (b. 1222)
date unknown
Kitbuqa, Mongol military leader (executed)
 Sicko Sjaerdema, ruler of Friesland
 Ibn al-Abbar, Andalusian diplomat and scholar (b. 1199)
 probable – Franciscus Accursius, Italian jurist

References